The House of Della Scala, whose members were known as Scaligeri or Scaligers (from the Latinized de Scalis), was the ruling family of Verona and mainland Veneto (except for Venice) from 1262 to 1387, for a total of 125 years.

History 
When Ezzelino III was elected podestà of the commune in 1226, he was able to convert the office into a permanent lordship. Upon his death the Great Council elected as podestà Mastino I, who succeeded in converting the signoria (seigniory) into a family inheritance, governing at first with the acquiescence of the commune, then, when they failed to re-elect him in 1262, he effected a coup d'état and was acclaimed  ("people's captain"), at the head of the commune's troops. In 1277 Mastino was killed by a faction of the nobles. The reign of his son Alberto as capitano (1277–1302) was an incessant war against the counts of San Bonifacio, who were aided by the House of Este. Of his three sons, Cangrande I inherited the podestà position in 1308, only the last shared the government (1308) and made a name as warrior, prince and patron of Dante, Petrarch and Giotto. By war or treaty he brought under his control the cities of Padua (1328), Treviso (1329), and Vicenza.

Cangrande I was succeeded by his nephews Mastino II (1329–1351) and Alberto. Mastino, the richest and most powerful prince of his generation in Italy, continued his uncle's policy, conquering Brescia in 1332 and carrying his power beyond the Po river. He purchased Parma (1335) and Lucca (1339). A powerful league was formed against him in 1337: Florence, Venice, the Visconti, the Este and the Gonzaga all joined, and after a three-year war, the Scaliger dominions were reduced to Verona and Vicenza.

His son Cangrande II (1351–1359) was a cruel and suspicious tyrant; not trusting his own subjects, he surrounded himself with German mercenaries, but was killed by his brother Cansignorio (1359–1375), who beautified Verona with palaces, provided it with aqueducts and bridges and founded the state treasury. He also killed his other brother, Paolo Alboino. Fratricide among the Scaligeri continued when Antonio (1375–1387), Cansignorio's natural son, slew his brother Bartolomeo. This aroused the indignation of the people, who deserted him when Gian Galeazzo Visconti of Milan made war on him. Having exhausted all his resources, he fled from Verona at midnight (19 October 1387), thus ending the Scaliger domination.

His son Can Francesco attempted fruitlessly to recover Verona (1390). Guglielmo (1404), natural son of Cangrande II, was more fortunate: with the support of the people, he drove out the Milanese, but he died ten days thereafter, and Verona then submitted to Venice (1405). The last representatives of the Scaligeri lived at the imperial court and repeatedly attempted to recover Verona by the aid of popular uprisings. After the Scaligeri had been ousted, two self-proclaimed members of the family, Giulio Cesare della Scala (also known as Julius Caesar Scaliger) and his son Joseph Justus Scaliger, made a reputation as humanist scholars, though their relationship to the historic Scaliger family is disputed.

The church of Santa Maria Antica in Verona is surrounded with the tombs (arche) of the Scaligeri in the form of Gothic shrines, or tempietti, enclosing their sarcophagi: Cangrande della Scala is memorialized with an equestrian statue; Cansignorio by a marble Gothic monument by Bonino da Campione, 1374.

See also
Zavarise

References

 
Kingdom of Italy (Holy Roman Empire)
Italian noble families